The Sanremo Music Festival 1979 was the 29th annual Sanremo Music Festival, held at the Teatro Ariston in Sanremo, province of Imperia between 11 and 13 January 1979. The final night was broadcast by Rai 1, while the first two nights were broadcast live only by radio.

The show was presented by Mike Bongiorno, assisted by the actress Anna Maria Rizzoli.
  
The winner of the Festival was Mino Vergnaghi with the song "Amare".

Participants and results

References 

Sanremo Music Festival by year
1979 in Italian music
1979 music festivals